The 2017 Toppserien is the 31st season of the highest women's football league in Norway. LSK Kvinner entered the season as the defending champions, and claimed their fourth consecutive title, securing the crown with two rounds to spare.

League table

Top scorers

References

External links
 Official website
 Fixtures and results
 Season on soccerway.com

Toppserien seasons
Top level Norwegian women's football league seasons
Norway
Norway
1